Tveit may refer to:

People
Aaron Tveit (born 1983), an American actor and singer
Alf Kåre Tveit (born 1967), a former footballer who played from 1988 to 1993 for Viking FK
Astrid Tveit (born 1957), a retired Norwegian high jumper
Christian Tveit (born 1992), a Norwegian football striker from Farsund
Espen Tveit (born 1991), a Norwegian speed skater
Ivar Tveit (1880–1952), a Norwegian newspaper editor
John S. Tveit (born 1931), a Norwegian politician for the Christian Democratic Party
Odd Karsten Tveit (born 1945), a Norwegian journalist, writer, and economist
Olav Fykse Tveit (born 1960), a Norwegian Lutheran theologian
Nils Tveit (1876–1949), a Norwegian politician for the Liberal Party

Places
Tveit, a village and district in the city of Kristiansand in Agder county, Norway
Tveit (municipality), a former municipality in the old Vest-Agder county, Norway
Tveit, Åmli, a village in Åmli municipality in Agder county, Norway
Tveit, Bygland, a village in Bygland municipality in Agder county, Norway

Churches
Tveit Church (Agder), Norway, a parish church
Tveit Church (Vestland), Norway, a parish church

See also
Tveite (disambiguation)